The Christian Science Sentinel (originally the Christian Science Weekly) is a magazine published by the Christian Science Publishing Society based in Boston, Massachusetts. The magazine was launched by Mary Baker Eddy in 1898. It includes articles, editorials, and accounts of healings from a Christian Science point of view.

The Christian Science Sentinel Radio Edition is a weekly radio program broadcast around the world and released monthly on CD and audiocassette. It deals with the same issues as the magazine, via interviews and discussions.

References

External links
Official website

Weekly magazines published in the United States
Christian Science magazines
Magazines established in 1898
Magazines published in Boston